Die Hard Trilogy 2: Viva Las Vegas is a video game developed by n-Space and published by Fox Interactive for Microsoft Windows and PlayStation in 2000. It is a sequel to Die Hard Trilogy, which was based on the Die Hard series of action movies. Like its predecessor, the game features three distinct genres; a third-person shooter, a light gun game, and an action driving game. Unlike Die Hard Trilogy, which has three separate storylines based on the first three Die Hard films, Die Hard Trilogy 2 has a single original storyline that alternates between the three genres throughout the levels.

Gameplay
Unlike the Die Hard Trilogy, the different sub-games or genres (third-person shooter, light gun shooter and driving) are integrated into "Movie Mode" with the player moving from game to game as they progress rather than selecting a single stand-alone game genre to play through. However, an individual sub-game can still be selected via "Arcade Mode".

The third-person shooter segments feature more advanced enemy AI in comparison to its predecessor with enemies walking patrol paths, actively looking for the player and responding to noises made by the player. Stealth elements are also incorporated into the game. A variety of standard weapons are available along with less traditional weapons such as flamethrower, shock rifle and jackhammer.

In addition to the standard PlayStation controller, the PlayStation Mouse, steering wheels and light guns can be used in the relevant parts of the game.

Plot
John McClane is living in an apartment in New York City until he receives a phone call from Kenny Sinclair, his best friend in the NYPD, to come to Las Vegas. Kenny was appointed as the new warden of the Mesa Grande Prison and is throwing a party in his honor. McClane accepts the invitation. At the party, McClane gets into a brief conversation about a prisoner named Klaus Von Haug, and meets Reese Hoffman, the owner of the Roaring 20's Casino, and his secretary Elena Goshkin. However, during the party, a prison riot occurs and Von Haug escapes from his prison cell, which meant it was up to McClane to defeat terrorists again.

As the game progresses, it is revealed that Kenny, Reese, and Elena are all in on the terrorist plot in their attempt to control Las Vegas. McClane dispatches them all, with Kenny being saved for last.

Development
Fox Interactive asked Picture House, a development studio which included key members of the team behind the original Die Hard Trilogy, to develop the sequel. Weary of the Die Hard franchise, Picture House turned down the offer in favor of working on Terracon.

Reception

Die Hard Trilogy 2: Viva Las Vegas received mixed reviews on both platforms according to the review aggregation website GameRankings.

IGNs Sam Bishop criticized the PlayStation version for failing to perfect any of the three gameplay genres featured, and stated that "there's really nothing to enjoy". He did give credit to the generally solid framerate and decent animations, despite bland textures. GameRevolution described the music as "awful" and criticized the same PS version's camera for allowing the player to see through walls. Additionally, the light-gun segments are noted as being terrible, despite praise received in the original game. Of the driving segments of the same console version, the review stated that "whoever designed this part of the game should be sent to prison". NextGens Daniel Erickson said of the same PS version, "A perfect example of trying to do everything while accomplishing nothing, Die Hard Trilogy 2 is a mess of poorly executed gameplay ideas and dated graphics."

Enid Burns of GamePro said that the PC version "offers a lot for fans of the Die Hard Trilogy, and brings the feeling of being in the movie to anyone who appreciates the action." Lou Gubrious said of the PlayStation version, "Like most sequels, DHT2 has its moments but pales in comparison to the original."

Notes

References

External links

2000 video games
Trilogy 2
Light gun games
PlayStation (console) games
Racing video games
Rail shooters
Third-person shooters
Video games about police officers
Video games developed in the United States
Video game sequels
Video games scored by BT (musician)
Video games set in the Las Vegas Valley
Windows games
Fox Interactive games
Video games set in Nevada
Video games about terrorism
Single-player video games